Javier 'Javi' González Gómez (born 22 March 1974) is a Spanish retired footballer. Mainly a midfielder, he could operate on either side of the pitch. 

He spent most of his professional career with Athletic Bilbao, competing in ten La Liga seasons and playing 249 competitive matches.

Football career
González was born in Barakaldo, Biscay. After growing through the ranks of Athletic Bilbao, he played one season each with Basque neighbours Deportivo Alavés (in the third division) and Sestao Sport Club (second level, relegated).

In 1997–98, after one year with fellow La Liga club RC Celta de Vigo, González returned to the local giants as a full member of the main squad, scoring five goals in 30 games as Athletic finished second and qualified for the UEFA Champions League. He even featured occasionally as an attacking right back.

After a serious knee injury in late 2004, González's role in Bilbao gradually diminished – only 26 league matches in three seasons combined. He also played during six months with Israeli Premier League's F.C. Ashdod, in a January 2006 loan.

In July 2007, González joined division two side Hércules CF, appearing sparingly in his first season. In the next, in which the Alicante team finished fourth, he was left without a squad number by manager Juan Carlos Mandiá.

Aged 35, González moved in August 2009 to lowly Club Portugalete, thus returning to his native region. He retired after two seasons in the fourth division.

References

External links

OneCo profile and stats 

1974 births
Living people
Spanish footballers
Footballers from Barakaldo
Association football midfielders
Association football utility players
La Liga players
Segunda División players
Segunda División B players
Tercera División players
Bilbao Athletic footballers
Deportivo Alavés players
Sestao Sport Club footballers
RC Celta de Vigo players
Athletic Bilbao footballers
Hércules CF players
Israeli Premier League players
F.C. Ashdod players
Basque Country international footballers
Spanish expatriate footballers
Expatriate footballers in Israel
Spanish expatriate sportspeople in Israel
Club Portugalete players